The Gables may refer to:

 The Gables, a fictional school in The Adventure of the Lion's Mane, a Sherlock Holmes story by Sir Arthur Conan Doyle
 The Gables, Gauteng, a suburb of Johannesburg, South Africa
 The Gables at Cobb Village, a residential community in Royston, Georgia
 Coral Gables, Florida is sometimes referred to as "The Gables"
 The Gables Colonial Hospital New Plymouth, a heritage buildings from New Plymouth, registered by Heritage New Zealand as a Category 1 Historic Place.

See also
 Gables (disambiguation)
 The Three Gables